Bahman is the eleventh and penultimate month of the Solar Hijri calendar, the official calendar of Iran and Afghanistan. Bahman has thirty days. It begins in January and ends in February of the Gregorian calendar. The month is equivalent to Aquarius in the Zodiac.

Bahman is the second month of winter, and is followed by Esfand.

In modern Persian "Bahman" literally means "Snow Avalanche".
But Bahman is also thought to be a derivative modern form of Vohu Manah. Vôhü Manö consists of two parts: VÔHÜ coming from the root vah, from Proto-Indo-European *ves 'to revere, stand in awe of', and MAN meaning 'passion, determination, spirit, mind power'. Vohu Manah is also a concept in Zoroastrianism meaning "pure mind/spirit" or "absolute consciousness".

Events 
 4 - 1302 - The Opening Ceremony of the 1924 Winter Olympics is held in Chamonix in France. Formerly titled as the "International Winter Sports Week", the Games were made in response to calls made in a 1920 IOC meeting to give winter sports their chance in the Olympic Games.
 8 – 1279 – the American League, the younger of the two leagues constituting Major League Baseball, was officially founded on the basis of the teams comprising a former regional minor league, the Western League.
 13 – 1252 – The National League, the older of the two leagues constituting Major League Baseball, was founded.
 13 – 1323 – Battle of Manila (1945) begins
 14 – 1326 – Sri Lanka, then Ceylon, becomes an independent nation under the Commonwealth, with full Dominion status.
 15 – 1394 – Bangladesh Bank heist

Births 
 10 – 1297 – Jackie Robinson, second baseman for the Brooklyn Dodgers, first African American player in modern-day Major League Baseball
 24 – 1364 – Todd Frazier, professional baseball player for the New York Mets, 34th overall draft pick in the 2007 Major League Baseball Draft, brother of Jeff Frazier, Olympic silver medalist

Deaths

Observances 
 Chinese New Year – Movable (either on the first to third week of Bahman)
 Super Bowl Sunday – Third or Fourth Sunday of Bahman
 Washington's Birthday and President's Day – Last Monday of Bahman
 Bahmanagān – 2 Bahman, Zoroastrian holiday
 Republic Day (India) and Australia Day – 6–7 Bahman
 Sadeh (Persian: سده‎ also transliterated as Sade), The Iranian fire festival – 10 Bahman
 Candlemas - 12 or 13 Bahman
 National Day of Sri Lanka – 16 Bahman 
 Islamic Revolution Day – 22 Bahman
 Valentine's Day – 25–26 Bahman

References 

Months of the Iranian calendar